Mehle is a surname. Notable people with the surname include:

Aileen Mehle (1918–2016), American journalist
Eyvind Mehle (1895–1945), Norwegian radio personality, media professor and Nazi collaborator
Roger W. Mehle (1915–1997), United States Navy admiral

See also 
Mehler